Wishek is a city in McIntosh County, North Dakota, United States. The population was 864 at the 2020 census.

History
Wishek was platted in 1898 when the railroad was extended to that point. A post office has been in operation at Wishek since 1898. The city was named in honor of John H. Wishek Sr., a local cattleman. Wishek was originally built up chiefly by Germans from Russia. The Old Wishek City Hall was built in 1916.

Geography

Demographics

2010 census
As of the census of 2010, there were 1,002 people, 454 households, and 263 families living in the city. The racial makeup of the city was 98.3% White, 0.9% Native American, 0.1% Asian, 0.4% from other races, and 0.3% from two or more races. Hispanic or Latino of any race were 3.1%.

Of the 454 households 20.0% had children under the age of 18 living with them, 52.4% were married couples living together, 3.7% had a female householder with no husband present, 1.8% had a male householder with no wife present, and 42.1% were non-families. 39.0% of households were one person and 23.8% were one person aged 65 or older. The average household size was 2.08 and the average family size was 2.75.

The median age was 51.5 years. 19.9% of residents were under the age of 18; 4.1% were between the ages of 18 and 24; 19.1% were from 25 to 44; 22.1% were from 45 to 64; and 34.9% were 65 or older. The gender makeup of the city was 47.0% male and 53.0% female.

2000 census

As of the census of 2000, there were 1,122 people, 466 households, and 290 families living in the city. The population density was 772.1 people per square mile (298.8/km2). There were 532 housing units at an average density of 366.1 per square mile (141.7/km2). The racial makeup of the city was 98.84% White, 0.18% Native American, 0.09% Pacific Islander, 0.09% from other races, and 0.80% from two or more races. Hispanic or Latino of any race were 1.52% of the population.

Of the 466 households 24.2% had children under the age of 18 living with them, 57.5% were married couples living together, 3.2% had a female householder with no husband present, and 37.6% were non-families. 35.0% of households were one person and 23.0% were one person aged 65 or older. The average household size was 2.15 and the average family size was 2.77.

The age distribution was 18.2% under the age of 18, 5.0% from 18 to 24, 18.4% from 25 to 44, 19.8% from 45 to 64, and 38.6% 65 or older. The median age was 54 years. For every 100 females, there were 82.4 males. For every 100 females age 18 and over, there were 81.1 males.

The median household income was $30,208 and the median family income was $36,696. Males had a median income of $25,441 versus $17,875 for females. The per capita income for the city was $17,111. About 4.4% of families and 6.4% of the population were below the poverty line, including 3.2% of those under age 18 and 10.9% of those age 65 or over.

Notable people

 Ted Mann, owner of the Mann Theatres
 Mark Pfeifle, top national security adviser and communicator for President George W. Bush

Climate
This climatic region is typified by large seasonal temperature differences, with warm to hot (and often humid) summers and cold (sometimes severely cold) winters.  According to the Köppen Climate Classification system, Wishek has a humid continental climate, abbreviated "Dfb" on climate maps.

References

External links
 City of Wishek, North Dakota
 North Dakota Chamber of Commerce

German-Russian culture in North Dakota
Cities in McIntosh County, North Dakota
Cities in North Dakota
Populated places established in 1898
1898 establishments in North Dakota